The following were the events of volleyball for the year 2018 throughout the world.

Beach volleyball

World and continental beach volleyball events
 July 9–13: 2018 World University Beach Volleyball Championship in  Munich
 Winners:  (Dan John & Eric Stadie) (m) /  (Nicole McNamara & Megan McNamara) (f)
 July 10–15: 2018 FIVB Beach Volleyball U19 World Championships in  Nanjing
 Winners:  (Denis Shekunov & Dmitrii Veretiuk) (m) /  (Mariia Bocharova & Maria Voronina) (f)
 July 15–22: 2018 European Beach Volleyball Championships in  The Hague, Rotterdam, Utrecht, & Apeldoorn
 Winners:  (Anders Mol & Christian Sørum) (m) /  (Sanne Keizer & Madelein Meppelink) (f)
 August 14–19: 2018 Swatch FIVB World Tour Finals in  Hamburg
 Winners:  (Anders Mol & Christian Sørum) (m) /  (Ágatha Bednarczuk & Eduarda Santos Lisboa) (f)

FIVB Beach Volleyball World Tour
 January 3 – TBD: 2018 FIVB Beach Volleyball World Tour

2018 Swatch Major Series (Five Star BV events)
 February 27 – March 4: Major #1 in  Fort Lauderdale, Florida
 Winners:  (Phil Dalhausser & Nick Lucena) (m) /  (Bárbara Seixas & Fernanda Alves) (f)
 July 10–15: Major #2 in  Gstaad
 Winners:  (Anders Berntsen Mol & Christian Sandlie Sørum) (m) /  (Sarah Pavan & Melissa Humana-Paredes) (f)
 July 31 – August 5: Major #3 (final) in  Vienna
 Winners:  (Anders Berntsen Mol & Christian Sandlie Sørum) (m) /  (Barbora Hermannová & Markéta Sluková) (f)

2018 Four Star BV events
 January 3–7: Four Star #1 in  The Hague
 Winners:  (Mārtiņš Pļaviņš & Edgars Tocs) (m) /  (April Ross & Alix Klineman) (f)
 March 6–10: Four Star #2 in  Doha (men only)
 Winners:  (Alexander Brouwer & Robert Meeuwsen)
 April 18–22: Four Star #3 in  Xiamen
 Winners:  (Oleg Stoyanovskiy & Igor Velichko) (m) /  (Sarah Pavan & Melissa Humana-Paredes) (f)
 May 1–6: Four Star #4 in  Huntington Beach, California
 Winners:  (Alexander Brouwer & Robert Meeuwsen) (m) /  (Bárbara Seixas & Fernanda Alves) (f)
 May 15–20: Four Star #5 in  Itapema
 Winners:  (André Stein & Evandro Oliveira) (m) /  (Ágatha Bednarczuk & Eduarda Santos Lisboa) (f)
 June 19–24: Four Star #6 in  Ostrava
 Winners:  (Pablo Herrera & Adrián Gavira) (m) /  (Barbora Hermannová & Markéta Sluková) (f)
 June 27 – July 1: Four Star #7 in  Warsaw
 Winners:  (Piotr Kantor & Bartosz Łosiak) (m) /  (Heather Bansley & Brandie Wilkerson) (f)
 July 4–8: Four Star #8 in  Espinho
 Winners:  (Jānis Šmēdiņš & Aleksandrs Samoilovs) (m) /  (Taliqua Clancy & Mariafe Artacho del Solar) (f)
 August 7–12: Four Star #9 in  Moscow
 Winners:  (Jānis Šmēdiņš & Aleksandrs Samoilovs) (m) /  (Summer Ross & Sara Hughes) (f)
 October 9–14: Four Star #10 in  Yangzhou
 Winners:  (Ilya Leshukov & Konstantin Semenov) (m) /  (April Ross & Alix Klineman) (f)
 October 16–21: Four Star #11 (final) in  Las Vegas
 Winners:  (Anders Berntsen Mol & Christian Sandlie Sørum) (m) /  (Heather Bansley & Brandie Wilkerson) (f)

2018 Three Star BV events
 February 20–24: Three Star #1 in  Kish Island (men only)
 Winners:  (Mariusz Prudel & Jakub Szalankiewicz)
 May 2–6: Three Star #2 in  Mersin
 Winners:  (Ilya Leshukov & Konstantin Semenov) (m) /  (Katharina Schützenhöfer & Lena Plesiutschnig) (f)
 May 9–13: Three Star #3 in  Lucerne
 Winners:  (John Mayer & Trevor Crabb) (m) /  (Mariafe Artacho del Solar & Taliqua Clancy) (f)
 July 18–22: Three Star #4 in  Haiyang
 Winners:  (Robin Seidl & Philipp Waller) (m) /  (Betsi Flint & Emily Day) (f)
 July 24–29: Three Star #5 in  Tokyo
 Winners:  (Marco Grimalt & Esteban Grimalt) (m) /  (Teresa Mersmann & Cinja Tillmann) (f)
 September 30 – October 4: Three Star #6 in  Qinzhou
 Winners:  (Tri Bourne & Trevor Crabb) (m) /  (Ana Patricia Silva Ramos & Rebecca Cavalcanti Barbosa Silva) (f)
 October 23–28: Three Star #7 (final) in  Chetumal (women only)
 Winners:  (Heather Bansley & Brandie Wilkerson)

2018 Two Star BV events
 May 4–6: Two Star #1 in  Phnom Penh (women only)
 Winners:  (Anna Behlen & Sarah Schneider)
 May 31 – June 3: Two Star #2 in  Jinjiang
 Winners:  (Trevor Crabb, Jr. & John Mayer) (m) /  (Sayaka Mizoe & Suzuka Hashimoto) (f)
 June 7–10: Two Star #3 in  Nantong (women only)
 Winners:  (Josemari Alves & Liliane Maestrini)
 June 14–17: Two Star #4 in  Tangshan (women only)
 Winners:  (Josemari Alves & Liliane Maestrini)
 June 21–24: Two Star #5 in 
 Winners:  (GAO Peng & LI Yang) (m) /  (Chiyo Suzuki & Reika Murakami) (f)
 July 25–29: Two Star #6 in  Agadir
 Winners:  (Maksim Hudyakov & Ruslan Bykanov) (m) /  (Marta Menegatti & Viktoria Orsi Toth) (f)
 September 14–16: Two Star #7 (final) in  Zhongwei (women only)
 Winners:  (WEN Shuhui & WANG Jingzhe)

2018 One Star BV events
 February 1–4: One Star #1 in  Shepparton
 Winners:  (Chase Frishman & James Avery Drost) (m) /  (Amanda Dowdy & Irene Pollock) (f)
 March 14–17: One Star #2 in  Muscat (men only)
 Winners:  (Philipp Arne Bergmann & Yannick Harms)
 March 15–18: One Star #3 in  Aalsmeer (men only)
 Winners:  (Alexander Brouwer & Robert Meeuwsen)
 April 8–11: One Star #4 in  Satun
 Winners:  (Nuttanon Inkiew & Sedtawat Padsawud) (m) /  (Caitlin Ledoux & Emily Stockman) (f)
 April 26–29: One Star #5 in  Langkawi
 Winners:  (Simon Frühbauer & Jörg Wutzl) (m) /  (Daria Mastikova & Ksenia Dabizha) (f)
 May 3–6: One Star #6 in  Manila
 Winners:  (Max-Jonas Karpa & Milan Sievers) (m) /  (Takemi Nishibori & Ayumi Kusano) (f)
 May 9–12: One Star #7 in  Tuần Châu (women only)
 Winners:  (Sayaka Mizoe & Suzuka Hashimoto)
 May 10–13: One Star #8 in  Bangkok
 Winners:  (Takumi Takahashi & Yusuke Ishijima) (m) /  (Bree Scarbrough & Aurora Davis) (f)
 May 17–20: One Star #9 in  Aydın
 Winners:  (Stefan Basta & Lazar Kolaric) (m) /  (Mailen Deliz Tamayo & Leila Consuelo Martinez Ortega) (f)
 May 24–27: One Star #10 in  Miguel Pereira
 Winners:  (Vinicius Rezende Costa Freitas & Luciano Ferreira de Paula) (m) /  (Adriana-Maria Matei & Beata Vaida) (f)
 May 31 – June 3: One Star #11 in  Alanya
 Winners:  (Maksim Hudyakov & Ruslan Bykanov) (m) /  (Sarah Schneider & Viktoria Seeber) (f)
 June 14–17: One Star #12 in  Baden bei Wien
 Winners:  (Clemens Doppler & Alexander Horst) (m) /  (Teresa Mersmann & Cinja Tillmann) (f)
 June 20–23: One Star #13 in  Manavgat
 Winners:  (Oscar Brandão & Luciano Ferreira de Paula) (m) /  (Satono Ishitsubo & Asami Shiba) (f)
 July 5–8: One Star #14 in  Poreč
 Winners:  (Sergiy Popov & Vladyslav Iemelianchyk) (m) /  (Torrey Van Winden & Emily Sonny) (f)
 July 5–8: One Star #15 in  Anapa
 Winners:  (HA Likejiang & WU Jiaxin) (m) /  (Nadezda Makroguzova & Svetlana Kholomina) (f)
 July 12–15: One Star #16 in  Daegu (women only)
 Winners:  (Phoebe Bell & Jessyka Ngauamo)
 July 19–22: One Star #17 in  Ulsan (women only)
 Winners:  (Kou Nai-han & LIU Pi Hsin)
 July 26–29: One Star #18 in  Samsun
 Winners:  (Jindrich Weiss & Donovan Džavoronok) (m) /  (Carolina Ferraris & Francesca Michieletto) (f)
 August 3–5: One Star #19 in  Ljubljana #1
 Winners:  (Valeriy Samoday & Taras Myskiv) (m) /  (Esmée Böbner & Zoé Vergé-Dépré) (f)
 August 8–12: One Star #20 in  Vaduz
 Winners:  (Valeriy Samoday & Taras Myskiv) (m) /  (Alexandra Wheeler & Lara Dykstra) (f)
 August 23–26: One Star #21 in  Siófok
 Winners:  (Romain di Giantommaso & Jérémy Silvestre) (m) /  (Tjasa Kotnik & Tjasa Jancar) (f)
 August 28 – September 1: One Star #22 in  Montpellier
 Winners:  (Edouard Rowlandson & Olivier Barthelemy) (m) /  (Alexandra Jupiter & Lézana Placette) (f)
 October 3–5: One Star #23 in  Bandar Torkaman (men only)
 Winners:  (Bahman Salemiinjehboroun & Arash Vakili)
 October 9–12: One Star #24 in  Babolsar (men only)
 Winners:  (Rahman Raoufi & Abolhamed Mirzaali)
 October 16–19: One Star #25 in  Bandar-e Anzali (men only)
 Winners:  (Alexey Sidorenko & Alexandr Dyachenko)
 November 29 – December 2: One Star #26 (final) in  Ljubljana #2 (winter edition)
 Winners:  (Aliaksandr Dziadkou & Pavel Piatrushka) (m) /  (Peny Karagkouni & Vassiliki Arvaniti) (f)

Volleyball

World & Challenger volleyball championships
 June 20 – 24: 2018 FIVB Volleyball Men's Challenger Cup in  Matosinhos (debut event)
  defeated , 3–1 in matches played, to win the inaugural FIVB Volleyball Men's Challenger Cup title.
  took third place.
 Note: Portugal has qualified to compete at the 2019 FIVB Volleyball Men's Nations League.
 June 20 – 24: 2018 FIVB Volleyball Women's Challenger Cup in  Lima (debut event)
  defeated , 3–1 in matches played, to win the inaugural FIVB Volleyball Women's Challenger Cup title.
  took third place.
 Note: Bulgaria has qualified to compete at the 2019 FIVB Volleyball Women's Nations League.
 September 9 – 30: 2018 FIVB Volleyball Men's World Championship in both  and 
  defeated , 3–0 in matches played, to win their second consecutive and third overall FIVB Volleyball Men's World Championship title.
  took third place.
 September 29 – October 20: 2018 FIVB Volleyball Women's World Championship in 
  defeated , 3–2 in matches played, to win their first FIVB Volleyball Women's World Championship title.
  took third place.

FIVB Nations League
 Note: The Nations League replaced both the World League for Men and the World Grand Prix for Women.
 May 15 – July 1: 2018 FIVB Volleyball Women's Nations League (final top six teams to  Nanjing)
  defeated , 3–2 in matches played, to win the inaugural FIVB Volleyball Women's Nations League title.
  took third place.
 May 25 – July 8: 2018 FIVB Volleyball Men's Nations League (final top six teams to  Lille)
  defeated , 3–0 in matches played, to win the inaugural FIVB Volleyball Men's Nations League title.
  took third place.

AVC
National teams events
 May 20 – 27: 2018 Asian Girls' U17 Volleyball Championship in  Nakhon Pathom
  defeated , 3–1 in matches played, to win their seventh consecutive and eighth overall Asian Girls' U17 Volleyball Championship title.
  took third place.
 Note: All the teams mentioned above, plus , have qualified to compete at the 2019 FIVB Volleyball Girls' U18 World Championship.
 June 10 – 17: 2018 Asian Women's U19 Volleyball Championship in  Bắc Ninh
  defeated , 3–0 in matches played, to win their sixth Asian Women's U19 Volleyball Championship title.
  took third place.
 June 29 – July 6: 2018 Asian Boys' U18 Volleyball Championship in  Tabriz
  defeated , 3–1 in matches played, to win their second consecutive Asian Boys' U18 Volleyball Championship title.
  took third place.
 Note: All teams mentioned above, plus , have qualified to compete at the 2019 FIVB Volleyball Boys' U19 World Championship.
 July 21 – 28: 2018 Asian Men's U20 Volleyball Championship in  Manama
  defeated , 3–0 in matches played, to win their sixth Asian Men's U20 Volleyball Championship title.
  took third place.
 Note: Iran and South Korea both qualified to compete at the 2019 FIVB Volleyball Men's U21 World Championship.
 August 8 – 15: 2018 Asian Men's Volleyball Cup in  Taipei
  defeated , 3–2 in matches played, to win their first Asian Men's Volleyball Cup title.
  took third place.
 September 15 – 22: 2018 Asian Men's Volleyball Challenge Cup in  Colombo (debut event)
  defeated , 3–2 in matches played, to win the inaugural Asian Men's Volleyball Challenge Cup title.
  took third place.
 Note: Iraq was promoted to compete at the 2020 Asian Men's Volleyball Cup.
 September 16 – 23: 2018 Asian Women's Volleyball Cup in  Nakhon Ratchasima
  defeated , 3–0 in matches played, to win their third consecutive and fifth overall Asian Women's Volleyball Cup title.
  took third place.

Clubs teams events
 July 11 – 18: 2018 Asian Women's Club Volleyball Championship in  Ust-Kamenogorsk
  Supreme Chonburi defeated  NEC Red Rockets, 3–2 in matches played, to win their second consecutive Asian Women's Club Volleyball Championship title.
  Jiangsu Zenith Steel took third place.
 Note: Supreme Chonburi has qualified to compete at the 2019 FIVB Volleyball Women's Club World Championship.
 July 30 – August 6: 2018 Asian Men's Club Volleyball Championship in  Naypyidaw
  Khatam Ardakan defeated  Atyrau, 3–0 in matches played, to win their first Asian Men's Club Volleyball Championship title.
  Wapda took third place.

NORCECA
 March 31 – April 7: 2018 CAZOVA Men's U21 Volleyball Championship in  Paramaribo
 Champions: ; Second: ; Third: 
 May 15 – 21: 2018 NORCECA Women's Challenge Cup (Continental Qualification Tournament) in  Edmonton
  defeated , 3–2 in matches played, in the final.  took third place.
 June 3 – 10: 2018 NORCECA Men's Challenge Cup (Continental Qualification Tournament) in  Pinar del Río
 Champions: ; Second: ; Third: 
 Note: Cuba booked their place in the World Final.
 June 4 – 11: 2018 Boys' Youth NORCECA Volleyball Championship in  San José
 Champions: ; Second: ; Third: 
 June 16 – 24: 2018 Women's Junior NORCECA Volleyball Championship in  Aguascalientes City
  defeated , 3–0 in matches played, to win their seventh Women's Junior NORCECA Volleyball Championship title.
  took third place.
 June 21 – 25: 2018 CAZOVA Women's U23 Volleyball Championship in  Kralendijk, Bonaire
 Champions: ; Second: ; Third: 
 June 28 – July 5: 2018 Women's CAZOVA Volleyball Championship in  Paramaribo
 Champions: ; Second: ; Third: ; Fourth: 
 July 6 – 9: 2018 ECVA Women's U20 Volleyball Championship in  Oranjestad, Sint Eustatius
 Champions: ; Second: ; Third:  Sint Eustatius; Fourth: 
 August 2 – 11: 2018 AFECAVOL Central American Women Senior Championship in  Belize City
 Champions: ; Second: ; Third: 
 August 4 – 11: 2018 Men's CAZOVA Volleyball Championship in  Paramaribo
 Champions: ; Second: ; Third: 
 August 15 – 20: 2018 Women's ECVA Volleyball Championships in  St. John's
  defeated  French Saint Martin, 3–1 in matches played, in the final.
  took third place.
 August 25 – September 2: 2018 Men's Junior NORCECA Volleyball Championship in  Havana
  defeated , 3–0 in matches played, to win their sixth Men's Junior NORCECA Volleyball Championship title.
  took third place.
 Note: Cuba has qualified to compete at the 2019 FIVB Volleyball Men's U21 World Championship.
 August 25 – September 2: 2018 Girls' Youth NORCECA Volleyball Championship in  Tegucigalpa
  defeated , 3–0 in matches played, to win their eighth Girls' Youth NORCECA Volleyball Championship title.
  took third place.
 Note: Both the United States and Canada have qualified to compete at the 2019 FIVB Volleyball Girls' U18 World Championship.
 September 4 – 10: 2018 Women's Junior NORCECA Final Four Volleyball Championship in  Lima
  defeated , 3–1 in matches played, in the final. 
  won the bronze medal, but  took third place.
 September 14 – 23: 2018 Men's U23 AFECAVOL Central American Volleyball Championship in  Guatemala City
 Champions: ; Second: ; Third: 
 November 1 – 4: 2018 Men's ECVA Volleyball Championship in  La Borie
  defeated , 3–2 in matches played, in the final. 
  took third place.
 November 8 – 17: 2018 Men's Central American Volleyball Championship in  San Salvador
 Champions: ; Second: ; Third:

CSV
Clubs teams events
 February 18 – 25: 2018 Women's South American Volleyball Club Championship in  Belo Horizonte
  Camponesa/Minas defeated fellow Brazilian team, Sesc RJ Vôlei, 3–2 in a tie break, to win their third Women's South American Volleyball Club Championship title.
  Club de Regatas Lima took third place.
 February 25 – March 4: 2018 Men's South American Volleyball Club Championship in  Montes Claros
  Sada Cruzeiro defeated  Lomas Vóley, 3–0 in matches played, to win their second consecutive and fifth overall Men's South American Volleyball Club Championship title.
  Montes Claros Vôlei took third place.

National teams events
 May 16 – 21: 2018 Men's South American Volleyball Challenger Cup in  Santiago
 Champions: ; Second: ; Third: ; Fourth: 
 May 23 – 28: 2018 Women's South American Volleyball Challenger Cup in  Lima
 Champions: ; Second: ; Third: ; Fourth: 
 June 6 – 13: 2018 Girls' Youth South American Volleyball Championship in  Valledupar
  defeated , 3–1 in matches played, to win their second Girls' Youth South American Volleyball Championship title.
  took third place.
 Note: All teams mentioned above have qualified to compete at the 2019 FIVB Volleyball Girls' U18 World Championship.
 September 22 – 29: 2018 Boys' Youth South American Volleyball Championship in  Sopó
  defeated , 3–0 in matches played, to win their 17th Boys' Youth South American Volleyball Championship title.
  took third place.
 Note: All three teams mentioned here have qualified to compete at the 2019 FIVB Volleyball Boys' U19 World Championship.
 October 15 – 22: 2018 Women's Junior South American Volleyball Championship in  Lima
  defeated , 3–2 in matches played, to win their 15th consecutive and 20th overall Women's Junior South American Volleyball Championship title.
  took third place.
 October 22 – 27: 2018 Men's Junior South American Volleyball Championship in  Bariloche
  defeated , 3–1 in matches played, to win their 19th Men's Junior South American Volleyball Championship title.
  took third place.

2018 Pan American Volleyball Cups
 July 8 – 14: 2018 Women's Pan-American Volleyball Cup in  Santo Domingo
  defeated , 3–2 in matches played, to win their second consecutive and sixth overall Women's Pan-American Volleyball Cup title.
  took third place.
 August 12 – 20: 2018 Women's U23 Pan-American Volleyball Cup in 
  defeated , 3–0 in matches played, to win their fourth consecutive Women's U23 Pan-American Volleyball Cup title. 
  took third place.
 August 26 – September 2: 2018 Men's Pan-American Volleyball Cup in  Córdoba, Veracruz
  defeated , 3–2 in matches played, to win their second consecutive Men's Pan-American Volleyball Cup title.
  took third place.
September 4 – 10: 2018 Women's U20 Final Four Volleyball Cup in  Lima
  defeated , 3–1 in matches played, in the final. 
  took third place, but  won that position, due to that Cuba was not at the tournament for positions.
 October 13 – 21: 2018 Men's U23 Pan-American Volleyball Cup in  Guatemala City
  defeated , 3–0 in matches played to win their second Men's U23 Pan-American Volleyball Cup title.
  took third place.

CEV
Clubs teams events
 November 21, 2017 – April 10, 2018: 2017–18 Men's CEV Cup
  Belogorie Belgorod defeated  Ziraat Bankası Ankara, 3–2 in matches played, to win their second Men's CEV Cup title.
 December 5, 2017 – April 11, 2018: 2017–18 CEV Challenge Cup
  Bunge Ravenna defeated  Olympiacos CFP, 6–2 in matches played in a 2-legged format, to win their second CEV Challenge Cup title.
 December 5, 2017 – May 13, 2018: 2017–18 CEV Champions League
  VC Zenit-Kazan defeated  Lube Cucine Civitanova, 3–2 in matches played, to win their fourth consecutive and sixth overall CEV Champions League title.
  Sir Colussi Sicoma Perugia took third place.
 December 12, 2017 – April 10, 2018: 2017–18 Women's CEV Cup
  Eczacıbaşı VitrA Istanbul defeated  Minchanka Minsk, 6–1 in matches played in a 2-legged format, to win their second Women's CEV Cup title.
 December 12, 2017 – April 11, 2018: 2017–18 CEV Women's Challenge Cup
  Olympiacos Piraeus defeated  Bursa BBSK, 5–4 in matches played in a 2-legged format, to win their first CEV Women's Challenge Cup title.
 December 12, 2017 – May 6, 2018: 2017–18 CEV Women's Champions League
  VakıfBank Istanbul defeated  CSM Volei Alba Blaj, 3–0 in matches played, to win their second consecutive and fourth overall CEV Women's Champions League title.
  Imoco Volley Conegliano took third place.

National teams events
 April 7 – 15: 2018 Boys' U18 Volleyball European Championship in  Zlín &  Púchov
  defeated , 3–0 in matches played, to win their first Boys' U18 Volleyball European Championship title.
  took third place.
April 13 – 21: 2018 Girls' U17 Volleyball European Championship in  Sofia
  defeated , 3–1 in matches played, to win their third consecutive and fourth overall Girls' U17 Volleyball European Championship title.
  took third place.
May 19 – June 16: 2018 Men's European Volleyball League
  defeated , 3–0 in matches played, to win their second Men's European Volleyball League title.
  took third place.
 Note: Both Estonia and the Czech Republic have qualified to compete at the 2018 FIVB Volleyball Men's Challenger Cup. May 19 – June 17: 2018 Women's European Volleyball League
  defeated , 3–0 in matches played, to win their first Women's European Volleyball League title.
  took third place.
 Note: Both Bulgaria and Hungary have qualified to compete at the 2018 FIVB Volleyball Women's Challenger Cup. July 14 – 22: 2018 Men's U20 Volleyball European Championship in  & the 
  defeated , 3–2 in matches played, to win their 19th Men's U20 Volleyball European Championship title.
  took third place.
 September 1 – 9: 2018 Women's U19 Volleyball European Championship in 
  defeated , 3–2 in matches played, to win their seventh Women's U19 Volleyball European Championship title.
  took third place.
 Note: Italy and Russia have qualified to compete at the 2019 FIVB Volleyball Women's U20 World Championship.''

CAVB
 March 4 – 16: 2018 Women's African Volleyball Clubs Championship in 
  Al Ahly defeated  CF de Carthage, 3–0 in matches played, to win their ninth Women's African Volleyball Clubs Championship title. 
  Kenya Pipelines took third place.
 March 25 – April 6: 2018 African Volleyball Clubs Champions Championship in 
  Al Ahly defeated fellow Egyptian team, Tala'ea El-Gaish SC, 3–0 in matches played, to win their second consecutive and 13th overall African Volleyball Clubs Champions Championship title.
  Smouha SC took third place.

References

External links
 FIVB - Fédération Internationale de Volleyball (International Volleyball Federation)

 
 
Volleyball by year
2018 sport-related lists